Creepy treehouse is a social media term, or internet slang, referring to websites or social networking platforms that professors use for educational purposes, but students regard as an invasion of privacy. The term, first described in 2008 by Utah Valley University instructional-design services director Jared Stein, describes "technological innovations by faculty members that make students’ skin crawl." The term also refers to online accounts and websites that users tend to avoid, especially young people who avoid visiting the pages of educators and other adults. Author Martin Weller defines creepy treehouse as a digital space where authority figures are viewed as invading younger people's privacy. 

University of Regina professor Alec Couros suggests that instead of "forcing" student participation with their own digital platforms, professors should use methods like online forums.

References

Internet culture
Internet forum terminology
Social media